KTCT (1050 kHz) is a commercial AM radio station licensed to San Mateo, California, and serving the San Francisco Bay Area.  It is owned by Cumulus Media and airs a sports radio format as KNBR 1050, a sister station to KNBR and KNBR-FM. In contrast to KNBR-AM-FM having local sports talk and play-by-play most of the day, KTCT emphasizes nationally syndicated programming from ESPN Radio and Westwood One Sports. KTCT is also the radio home for San Jose Earthquakes soccer, Stanford University football, and University of San Francisco men's basketball.

By day, KTCT is powered at 50,000 watts, the maximum for commercial AM stations in the U.S.  But because 1050 AM is a clear channel frequency reserved for Class A XEG Monterrey, KTCT reduces power at sunset to 10,000 watts.  It uses a directional antenna at all times with a five-tower array.  The transmitter is off West Winton Avenue in Hayward, near San Francisco Bay.

History

KVSM
In 1946, the station first signed on with the call sign KVSM, standing for the "Voice of San Mateo". The station ran only 250 watts and was a daytimer. The station was a network affiliate of the short lived Progressive Broadcasting System in the early 1950s. In 1953, the station's power was increased to 1,000 watts.

KOFY
In 1958, the station's call sign was changed to KOFY. From the 1960s through the 1980s, KOFY aired a Spanish language format. In early 1986, the station was sold to James Gabbert for $2,000,000. In March 1986, the station began airing an oldies format. In late 1986, the station added nighttime operations, running 500 watts. In 1989, the station's daytime power was increased to 50,000 watts, and its nighttime power was increased to 1,000 watts. In 1991, the station returned to airing a Spanish language format. In 1992, the station's nighttime power was increased to 10,000 watts.

KTCT
In 1997, the station adopted a sports format as "The Ticket", and its call sign was changed to KTCT. In 2003, the station was rebranded "KNBR 1050". Since 1999, the station has operated at 35,000 watts at night, but using its daytime antenna system, under a special temporary authority, due to the unauthorized nighttime operations of XED-AM 1050 in Mexicali, Baja California, Mexico.

Ownership
KNBR and KTCT are owned by Cumulus Media Partners, LLC, a private partnership of Cumulus Media, Bain Capital, The Blackstone Group, and Thomas H. Lee Partners. It was purchased from Susquehanna-Pfaltzgraff Media in 2005 along with other Susquehanna Radio Corporation stations.

Programming
On KTCT, weekday programming consists of the following blocks when not preempted by sports events. The morning shows have CBS Sports Radio with Barber, Tierney, Jacobsen; The John Feinstein Show, and The Jim Rome Show. The afternoon show is hosted by Ted Ramey and then The Tom Tolbert Show is simulcast with KNBR 680. The evening shows have Scott Ferrall's show Ferrall on the Bench, followed by late-night programming from CBS Sports Radio and then NBC Sports Radio. Weekend programs include Mortgage Makeover and various CBS Sports and NBC Sports Radio programming. On Sunday mornings to fulfill required public affairs programming guidelines, speeches and presentations from the Commonwealth Club of California are carried.

KNBR and KTCT are charter affiliates of CBS Sports Radio, a joint venture between CBS Radio and Cumulus, which started on January 2, 2013. NBC Sports Radio has also been covered on KTCT. Through these affiliates, other games and events from MLB, NBA, NFL, PGA Tour, NASCAR, and NCAA have been broadcast.

Live sports broadcasts
Sports content has included San Francisco Giants MLB baseball, San Jose SaberCats arena football, San Jose Earthquakes soccer, and Stanford Football. Some AM broadcasts on KNBR may be moved to KTCT due to conflicts with Giants games. Golden State Warriors basketball had also been covered until August 25, 2016, the Warriors announced they have ended their partnership with KNBR and signed with KGMZ-FM; the partnership with KNBR lasted 40 years, including 32 consecutive years.

In 2019, KTCT signed a contract to broadcast University of San Francisco men's basketball.

References

External links

Cumulus Media radio stations
ESPN Radio stations
CBS Sports Radio stations
TCT
Radio stations established in 1946
1946 establishments in California
San Jose Earthquakes
Stanford Cardinal football
San Francisco Dons men's basketball